The 2008 Adelaide Sevens, promoted as the International Rugby Sevens Adelaide 2008, was a rugby sevens tournament that was part of the IRB Sevens World Series in the 2007–08 season. It was the Australian Sevens leg of the series, held on the weekend of 5 and 6 April at the Adelaide Oval in South Australia.

South Africa halted New Zealand's winning streak, defeating them 15–7 in the Cup final. The Cook Islands provided the biggest upset of the competition by finishing 2nd in their group, thus qualifying to the Cup competition; they would parachute into the Plate competition after a 48–0 drubbing by Samoa in the Cup quarterfinals. Ultimately, Tonga won the Plate, defeating Kenya 14–12. Argentina won the Bowl and Wales won the Shield.

Format
The teams were drawn into four pools of four teams each. Each team played the other teams in their pool once, with 3 points awarded for a win, 2 points for a draw, and 1 point for a loss (no points awarded for a forfeit). The top two teams from each pool advanced to the Cup/Plate brackets. The bottom two teams from each group went on to the Bowl/Shield brackets.

Teams
The participating teams were:

Pool stage

Play on the first day of the tournament consisted of matches between teams in the same pool on a round robin basis. The following is a list of the recorded results.

Pool A
{| class="wikitable" style="text-align: center;"
|-
!width="200"|Team
!width="40"|Pld
!width="40"|W
!width="40"|D
!width="40"|L
!width="40"|PF
!width="40"|PA
!width="40"|+/-
!width="40"|Pts
|- 
|align=left| 
|3||3||0||0||92||31||+61||9
|-
|align=left| 
|3||1||0||2||64||76||-12||5
|-
|align=left| 
|3||1||0||2||54||78||-24||5
|-
|align=left| 
|3||1||0||2||49||74||-25||5
|}

Pool B
{| class="wikitable" style="text-align: center;"
|-
!width="200"|Team
!width="40"|Pld
!width="40"|W
!width="40"|D
!width="40"|L
!width="40"|PF
!width="40"|PA
!width="40"|+/-
!width="40"|Pts
|- 
|align=left| 
|3||3||0||0||73||55||+18||9
|-
|align=left| 
|3||2||0||1||84||31||+53||7
|-
|align=left| 
|3||1||0||2||60||64||-4||5
|-
|align=left| 
|3||0||0||3||43||110||-67||3
|}

Pool C
{| class="wikitable" style="text-align: center;"
|-
!width="200"|Team
!width="40"|Pld
!width="40"|W
!width="40"|D
!width="40"|L
!width="40"|PF
!width="40"|PA
!width="40"|+/-
!width="40"|Pts
|- 
|align=left| 
|3||3||0||0||83||24||+59||9
|-
|align=left| 
|3||2||0||1||59||52||+7||7
|-
|align=left| 
|3||1||0||2||38||91||-53||5
|-
|align=left| 
|3||0||0||3||48||61||-13||3
|}

Pool D
{| class="wikitable" style="text-align: center;"
|-
!width="200"|Team
!width="40"|Pld
!width="40"|W
!width="40"|D
!width="40"|L
!width="40"|PF
!width="40"|PA
!width="40"|+/-
!width="40"|Pts
|- 
|align=left| 
|3||3||0||0||93||38||+55||9
|-
|align=left| 
|3||2||0||1||52||51||+1||7
|-
|align=left| 
|3||1||0||2||43||66||-23||5
|-
|align=left| 
|3||0||0||3||34||67||-33||3
|}

Knockout

Play on the second day of the tournament consisted of finals matches for the Shield, Bowl, Plate, and Cup competitions. The following is a list of the recorded results.

Shield

Bowl

Plate

Cup

Reference list

External links
 Adelaide Sevens on irb.com
 IRB Sevens World Series

Adelaide
Australian Sevens
2008 in Australian rugby union